Orthione is a genus of Isopoda parasites, in the family Bopyridae, containing the following species:

Orthione furcata Richardson, 1904
Orthione griffenis Markham, 2004
Orthione mesoamericana Markham, 2004

References 

Isopod genera
Cymothoida